Bid Kard Gam (also Romanized as Bīd Kard Gam; also known as Bīd Kabgān, Bīdak-e-Yekān, and Bīdak Yekān) is a village in Neh Rural District, in the Central District of Nehbandan County, South Khorasan Province, Iran. At the 2006 census, its population was 68, in 9 families.

References 

Populated places in Nehbandan County